Mékro is a town in central Ivory Coast. It is a sub-prefecture of Kouassi-Kouassikro Department in N'Zi Region, Lacs District.

Mékro was a commune until March 2012, when it became one of 1126 communes nationwide that were abolished.

In 2014, the population of the sub-prefecture of Mékro was 6,495.

Villages
The 11 villages of the sub-prefecture of Mékro and their population in 2014 are:

References

Sub-prefectures of N'Zi Region
Former communes of Ivory Coast